Sancta Sophia College (colloquially as Sancta) is a residential college for undergraduate women and postgraduate men and women at the University of Sydney. The college has a Catholic foundation but admits students of all religions. Fiona Hastings has been the Principal of the College since 2018.

History

Foundation

In 1923, the Catholic Archbishop of Sydney, Michael Kelly, and the Bishops of New South Wales issued a letter in support of university education for the Catholic community and announced the construction of a Catholic hall of residence for women. This was a result of social and educational changes which facilitated higher education for women. Sancta Sophia College was founded in 1925 as a hall of residence for Catholic women, and on 16 August 1926, Sancta Sophia Hall was officially blessed and opened by Archbishop Kelly. The first cohort of 23 women moved into the college on 15 March 1926. In 1929, an Act of Parliament raised the hall to the status of a College within the University of Sydney.

Expansion
The college expanded over time including the East Wing and kitchen in 1961, the Octagon building in 1963, the McDonald Wing in 1970, the Vice Principal's flat in 1990, and the Principal's flat in 1993.

The College officially opened the Sancta Sophia Graduate House (often referred to as Grad House) in March 2014 by Governor, Her Excellency Marie Bashir and blessed by Cardinal George Pell. This was the largest single expansion in the College's history. The Graduate House consists of 128 ensuite rooms equipped with a microwave oven and mini fridge, whilst the common areas have full kitchens. The rooftop terrace is equipped with a BBQ lounge area. Every resident has meals fully catered for and served in a common dining hall with undergraduates.

Student life

Academic
As a university college, academia is the main focus of Sancta Sophia College. A program of supplementary tutorials exists for undergraduate students and some postgraduate students. These are organised within the College and undergraduate students may attend tutorials at the other colleges. In recent years, the tutorial program has extended to support postgraduate students, particularly in medicine.

Cultural
Sancta competes against other University of Sydney residential colleges in the InterCol Performing Arts Challenge (also known as the Palladian Cup). The Palladian Cup runs year-round and features solo vocal, ensemble vocal, solo instrumental, ensemble instrumental, oration, debating, solo drama, ensemble drama, dance, and art. Since 2017, Sancta has competed in Intramural Arts at the University of Sydney and provides opportunities in dance, improv, debating, and others.

Sporting
Sancta competes in the Sydney University Intercollegiate sporting events, which is the Rosebowl Cup for women and Rawson Cup for men. The Rosebowl Cup events take place throughout the year and include netball, swimming, rowing, hockey, soccer, basketball, tennis, and athletics. Due to the relatively small cohort of men, Sancta only competes in three Rawson Cup events: swimming, rowing, and athletics.

College governance

Council and principal 
The Council of the College consists of the chairman, the Principal and 14 other Councillors, of whom 3 must be priests.  The Council is responsible for governance of the College.

The Principal is responsible for the management of the College.

Past principals 

 (1930-1931) Mother Margaret MacRory
 (1931-1943) Mother Helen Boydell
 (1943-1957) Mother Juanita Macrae
 (1952) Mother Hoare (Acting Principal)
 (1958-1972) Mother Yvonne Swift
 (1972-1975) Sr Mary Brennan
 (1975-1978) Sr Mary d'Apice
 (1979-1983) Sr Patricia Toohey
 (1983-1992) Sr Mary Shanahan
 (1992-2000) Janice Raggio
 (2000-2005) Barbara Walsh
 (2005-2007) Dr Elizabeth Hepburn
 (2008-2017) Dr Marie Leech
 (2018-present) Fiona Hastings

Student committees
All undergraduate students of the College are members of the Sancta Sophia Students' Association. The Students' Association is run by a student-elected House Committee. The House Committee is responsible for planning activities on behalf of the undergraduate students. It is also responsible for liaising with the other colleges and carrying out general activities and business of the Students' Association. The members of the House Committee convene each week to discuss student matters of the College.

All postgraduate students of the College are members of the Senior Common Room, which is run by the elected Executive. The Senior Common Room is responsible for the organisation of events and activities specific to postgraduate students. The members of the Senior Common Room convene every month to discuss postgraduate matters of the College and often involve negotiations with the House Committee.

Notable alumni and community members

Politics and law 
Jacqueline Gleeson – Justice of the High Court of Australia
Natalie Adams – Judge of the Supreme Court of New South Wales
Clover Moore – Lord Mayor of Sydney and Member of NSW Legislative Assembly
Ella Stack  – First Lord Mayor of Darwin
Anne Conlon –  Australian feminist, public servant and labour activist.

Academia and medicine 
Wirginia Maixner – Neurosurgeon and Director of Neurosurgery, Royal Children's Hospital, Melbourne
Sheila Cassidy – Doctor, former Medical Director of St Luke's Hospice in Plymouth, torture survivor
Gwen Fleming  – Doctor and Major in the Royal Australian Army Medical Corps

Business 

Louise Walsh – CEO of Future Generation Investment Company, former CEO of Philanthropy Australia
Helena Carr – Businesswoman and wife of former Premier of New South Wales, and former Senator and former Foreign Minister, Bob Carr
Sir Michael Hintze – Founder & CEO of Hedge Fund CQS, Economics Tutor at College

Arts and humanities 
Miranda Devine – Journalist and political commentator
Lee Lewis – Australian Theatre Director

Publications

Journals

The Anser 

 The Anser, Volume 1, 2018
 The Anser Volume 2, 2020

References

Residential colleges of the University of Sydney
Educational institutions established in 1925
1925 establishments in Australia
Sacred Heart universities and colleges
Camperdown, New South Wales